Sansara naumanni is a moth in the family Cossidae. It was described by Yakovlev in 2004. It is found in Thailand.

References

Natural History Museum Lepidoptera generic names catalog

Zeuzerinae
Moths described in 2004